Orlík nad Vltavou is a municipality and village in Písek District in the South Bohemian Region of the Czech Republic. It has about 300 inhabitants. It is known for the Orlík Castle.

Administrative parts
The village of Staré Sedlo is an administrative part of Orlík nad Vltavou.

Geography
It lies mostly in the Benešov Uplands. The municipality lies on the shores of the Orlík Reservoir, built on the Vltava River.

Sights

Orlík nad Vltavou is well known for the Orlík Castle. It was originally a fortress dating from the early 13th century at the latest, which was expanded into a strong Gothic castle. Until 1357, it was a royal castle. In 1719, it was inherited by the House of Schwarzenberg, who owned it until 1948.

Nowadays, the castle once again belongs to the Schwarzenbergs. It is open to the public. Next to the castle is a castle park. Of the park's original area of 180 ha,  have been preserved, the rest was flooded during the construction of the reservoir in the 1960s. In the castle park there is the Schwarzenberg family tomb from the mid-19th century.

Notable people
Jan Bedřich Kittl (1806–1868), composer

See also
Orlík killers

References

External links

Villages in Písek District